The Minister of Public Works and Transport of Hungary was a member of the Hungarian cabinet from 1848 until 1889, when the ministry was merged into the Ministry of Trade. The last minister was Gábor Baross.

This page is a list of Ministers of Public Works and Transport of Hungary.

Ministers of Public Works and Transport (1848–1889)

Hungarian Kingdom (1848–1849)
Parties

Hungarian State (1849)
Parties

After the collapse of the Hungarian Revolution of 1848, the Hungarian Kingdom became an integral part of the Austrian Empire until 1867, when dual Austro-Hungarian Monarchy was created.

Hungarian Kingdom (1867–1889)
Parties

See also
List of heads of state of Hungary
List of prime ministers of Hungary
List of Ministers of Agriculture of Hungary
List of Ministers of Civilian Intelligence Services of Hungary
List of Ministers of Croatian Affairs of Hungary
List of Ministers of Defence of Hungary
List of Ministers of Education of Hungary
List of Ministers of Finance of Hungary
List of Ministers of Foreign Affairs of Hungary
List of Ministers of Interior of Hungary
List of Ministers of Justice of Hungary
Politics of Hungary

Agriculture Ministers